Noxolo Maqashalala (1977 – March 2021) was a South African actress often known by the name Noxee.

Career
Maqashalala was born in KwaBhaca, Eastern Cape. Her break-out role was as Viwe in the first three seasons of youth drama series Tsha Tsha from 2003 to 2005. She also appeared in the SABC 1 shows Generations, Binnelanders, Dream World and Intersexions, the SABC 2 show Gauteng Maboneng, and e.tv's Rhythm City, Easy Money, Mzansi Love and The Kingdom - uKhakhayi. She also starred in the SABC 1 legal drama Diamond City in 2018 and was credited as an executive producer on the show. Diamond City later also aired on Netflix.

Death
She was found dead at her Johannesburg home on 12 March 2021, aged 44. Eastern Cape arts, culture, sport and recreation MEC Fezeka Nkomonye commended her as being exemplary in the arts and called her death "a blow to the industry".  South Africa's minister of sport, arts and culture, Nathi Mthethwa, called her "a sterling performer who gave her best at every role that she took on".

Filmography

Film

Television

References

External links

South African television actresses
1977 births
2021 deaths